The United States Office of Government Ethics (OGE) is an independent agency within the executive branch of the U.S. Federal Government which is responsible for directing executive branch policies relating to the prevention of conflicts of interest on the part of Federal executive branch officers and employees.  Under the Ethics in Government Act, this agency was originally part of the Office of Personnel Management from 1978 until it separated in 1989.

Primary duties
The main duties of OGE include the following:
Establishing the standards of conduct for the executive branch; 
Issuing rules and regulations interpreting the criminal conflict of interest restrictions; 
Establishing the framework for the public and confidential financial disclosure systems for executive branch employees; 
Developing training and education programs for use by executive branch ethics officials and employees; 
Ensuring that individual agency ethics programs are functioning properly by setting the requirements for them, supporting them, and reviewing them.

History
Government ethics concerns in the United States were first addressed by Congress in 1853. The act, entitled "An Act to prevent Frauds upon the Treasury of the United States," made it a misdemeanor for "any officer of the United States" or "any Senator or Representative in Congress" to assist in or prosecute "any claim against the United States."

Ethics concerns continued to obtain during the Civil War.  Theodore Roosevelt, prior to becoming Vice-President, served as United States Civil Service Commissioner under President Benjamin Harrison. He drew on this experience to help create the modern merit system (now exemplified by the United States Merit Systems Protection Board) for federal employees, as President. This, in turn, led to further developments, including the focus on ethics in Franklin Delano Roosevelt's 1933 inaugural speech.

Following Watergate, Congress passed the Ethics in Government Act of 1978 as an attempt to curb the ongoing issues with Ethics in Government.

Office of Director
The Director of OGE is appointed by the President after confirmation by the U.S. Senate. The Director of OGE serves a five-year term, thereby overlapping presidential terms, and is subject to no term limit. The rest of the OGE employees are career civil servants. Created by the Ethics in Government Act of 1978, OGE separated from the U.S. Office of Personnel Management in 1989 pursuant to reform legislation.

Emory Rounds is the current Director of the OGE, having been sworn into office on August 2, 2018.

Issues involving President Trump
A series of tweets on 30 November 2016 from the office's official Twitter account praised President-elect Donald Trump for planning to divest his business holdings in order to resolve potential conflicts of interest, following an announcement where Trump reaffirmed his intent to take himself out of business operations, despite him having made no firm commitment to a divestment like selling his businesses or a blind trust. A number of observers speculated that the office's account might have been hacked, a suggestion it later denied. The New York Times suggested that the apparent misunderstanding behind the postings were deliberately intended to reveal the independent agency had advised Trump's legal counsel that a divestment was the only adequate remedy for resolving any conflict, and, by extension, pressure Trump into doing so. A Freedom of Information Act request by news organization The Daily Dot revealed that OGE Director Walter M. Shaub personally ordered officials within the agency to post the nine tweets.

Under the Trump Administration, the Office reversed its own internal policy prohibiting anonymous donations from lobbyists to White House staffers who have legal defense funds.

OGE certification of Ethics Agreement Compliance Form
On May 11, 2017, the Office of Government Ethics requested the Trump administration and its associates submit a form regarding divestment of assets and possible conflicts of interest.

List of directors of the OGE
 J. Jackson Walter, 1979–1982
 David H. Martin, 1983–1987
 Frank Q. Nebeker, 1987–1989
 Stephen D. Potts, 1990–2000
 Amy Comstock, 2000–2003
Robert Cusick, 2006−2011
 Walter Shaub, 2013–2017
David J. Apol, 2017–2018 (acting)
Emory A. Rounds III, 2018–

See also
 Title 5 of the Code of Federal Regulations

References

External links

Ethics organizations
Government Ethics
Year of establishment missing